Chiang Dao Wildlife Sanctuary is a protected area in Chiang Mai Province, Thailand. Established on 25 August 1978, the sanctuary covers 521 km2 of the Doi Chiang Dao and southern mountainous regions of the Daen Lao Range, north of the Thanon Thong Chai Range. The tallest summit is 2,175 m high Doi Chiang Dao.

The sanctuary area is covered by various forest types, depending on altitude, including dry evergreen forests, hill evergreen forests, coniferous forests, deciduous dipterocarp forests, and meadows. It is the home to a number of endangered species of animals, such as long-tailed gorals (Naemorhedus caudatus), Sumatran serows (Capricornis sumatraensis), Asian golden cats (Catopuma temminckii), and big-headed turtles (Platysternon megacephalum). Deignan's babblers (Stachyridopsis rodolphei) and Huia melasma are endemic to this area. This sanctuary is also home to Rhacophorus kio, a species of flying frog.

See also
Doi Chiang Dao
Pha Daeng National Park, formerly known as Chiang Dao National Park.

References

External links

 Division of Information System on Wildlife Conservation. Chiang Dao Wildlife Sanctuary 
 Wildlife Conservation Office. Chiang Dao Wildlife Sanctuary 
 Birdwatching, Doi Chiang Dao National Park

Wildlife sanctuaries of Thailand
Geography of Chiang Mai province
Protected areas established in 1978
1978 establishments in Thailand